The Cordulegastridae are a family of Odonata (dragonflies) from the suborder Anisoptera. They are commonly known as spiketails. Some vernacular names for the species of this family are biddie and flying adder. They have large, brown or black bodies with yellow markings, and narrow unpatterned wings. Their bright eyes touch at a single point, and they can be found along small, clear, woodland streams, flying slowly 30 to 70 cm above the water. When disturbed, however, they can fly very rapidly. They usually hunt high in forest vegetation, and prefer to capture prey resting on leaves or branches (known as gleaning).

The Cordulegastridae usually lay their eggs in the sand in shallow water, the female hovering just above the water with her body in a vertical position, and making repeated dips into the water with her abdomen.

The family is distributed worldwide; all eight species in North America belong to the genus Cordulegaster.

The name Cordulegastridae comes from the Greek kordylinus, 'club-shaped' and gaster, belly. The common name spiketails refers to the females' prominent ovipositors.

References

 
Cordulegastroidea
Odonata families